Matt Doran (born 22 December 1982) is an Australian journalist. Doran is currently co-host of Weekend Sunrise with Monique Wright. Previously he has been a reporter for the Seven Network's flagship public affairs program, Sunday Night and a reporter and presenter at Network Ten.

Career
Doran graduated from Melbourne University in 2003 with a Bachelor of Media and Communications (enriched Journalism major).

Throughout 2006, he worked as a police reporter with Melbourne's Herald Sun newspaper, covering fires, floods, the gangland war and CBD shootings. In the four years prior, he held a position as an awarded reporter and senior editor across a number of mastheads within News Ltd's Leader newspaper group.

Network Ten 
Following this, Doran worked for several years as a general news reporter and then police reporter for Network Ten in Melbourne and Adelaide.  Doran played a key role in Network Ten's coverage of a series of natural disasters, including the devastating Christchurch earthquakes, the deadly Pike River mine explosion in New Zealand's West, the Christmas Island boat tragedy and the tsunami which obliterated North-East Japan.

In October 2011, Doran was appointed presenter of Ten News at Five: Weekend with Natarsha Belling, but left the bulletin when it changed to a single-presenter format with only Belling in November 2012. He continued to be a fill-in presenter and a senior reporter with Ten News.

In November 2013, Doran was appointed presenter of Ten Eyewitness News Early and Ten Eyewitness News Morning. In January 2014, Hermione Kitson replaced Doran on Ten Eyewitness News Early. He continued to present Ten Eyewitness News Morning until the bulletin was cancelled in May 2014 due to cost-cutting measures, and Doran returned to reporting. 

In May 2015, Doran resigned from Network Ten after nearly eight years with the network.

Seven Network 
In March 2017, Doran joined the Seven Network as a reporter on its flagship public affairs program, Sunday Night.  One of his interviewees was former The Sullivans actress, Susan Hannaford, whose Beverley Hills lifestyle surprised many viewers.

In October 2019, it was announced that Doran will replace Basil Zempilas as co-host of Weekend Sunrise from October 12. He had previously been an intermittent fill-in host on the show, and also regularly fills in for David Koch on Sunrise and Larry Emdur on The Morning Show.

In November 2021, Doran was suspended by the Seven Network for two weeks after failing to adequately prepare for an interview with British singer Adele.

Other 
In 2015, Doran moved to Los Angeles and was appointed host of Crime Watch Daily, a daily syndicated true crime news program.

In February 2017, Doran was appointed host of the third season of Crimes that Shook Australia on Foxtel's crime and investigation channel, exploring some of Australia's most shocking crimes with interviews and dramatic reconstructions.

Personal life 
Doran attended and graduated from St Kevin's College in Toorak, Victoria, completing his Victorian Certificate of Education.

On 31 December 2020, Doran got engaged to Weekend Today executive producer Kendall Bora. They married in December 2021.

References

External links
Matt Doran bio

Living people
10 News First presenters
Seven News presenters
1982 births